Protomelas annectens is a species of cichlid endemic to Lake Malawi where it is found in sandy shallows with large species of cichlid.  This species can reach a length of  TL.  This species can also be found in the aquarium trade.

References

External links 
 Photograph

annectens
Fish described in 1922
Taxonomy articles created by Polbot